A by-election occurred in the South Australian House of Assembly seat of Ramsay on 11 February 2012. The seat was won by Labor candidate Zoe Bettison. The by-election was triggered by the resignation of former Premier and state Labor MHA Mike Rann.

Background
Rann and Kevin Foley resigned from their parliamentary seats, which created twin by-elections for 11 February, the other being the 2012 Port Adelaide by-election. On two-party preferred margins of 18.0 percent and 12.8 percent from the 2010 election, considered safe margins on the previous pendulum, Labor would have likely retained both seats on the two-party preferred vote based on unchanged statewide Newspoll since the previous election. Ramsay was the safest of Labor's seats based on the previous election. In the lower house, 24 seats form a majority, the Labor government held 26 of 47 seats. If one or both seats were lost, Labor would still have retained majority government.

Rann was first elected as the member for the new northern metropolitan seat of Briggs at the 1985 election. From 1989 he held various ministries in the Bannon Labor government. Briggs was abolished in an electoral redistribution, with Rann moving to Ramsay in 1993. Rann was state Labor leader and leader of the opposition from 1994 after the Labor government was defeated a year earlier. Rann led Labor to minority government at the 2002 election, a landslide majority government at the 2006 election, and retained majority government at the 2010 election despite a swing. Rann stepped down in favour of Jay Weatherill as party leader and Premier in 2011. Rann is the third-longest-serving Premier of South Australia and longest-serving South Australian Labor leader, and afterward became the longest-serving period of South Australian Labor government in history.

The last by-election was the 2009 Frome by-election, when another former Premier, Rob Kerin, retired from politics. The seat was narrowly won by an independent candidate.

Timeline

Candidates

The Liberal Party, Family First Party, and the Australian Democrats, who contested the previous election and gained 24.9 percent, 9.6 percent, and 3.0 percent respectively, did not contest the by-election.

Polling
One opinion poll was conducted and released by the in-house polling group at The Advertiser, Adelaide's main newspaper. On 30 January 2012, 410 voters were polled in the seat. After the Liberal Party declined to field a candidate, Labor's primary vote was at 51 percent (57.9 percent at the last election), with the LDP on 23 percent, Aldridge on 10 percent, the Greens on 9 percent (4.6 percent), with remaining candidates on about 7 percent collectively.

Labor was expected to easily retain the seat.

Result

Labor retained the seat on a 66.7 percent two-candidate preferred vote against Aldridge, with a majority in all nine polling places – Ramsay remained the safest Labor seat in the parliament. Postal votes were included on 13 February, absentee and pre-poll votes were included on 14 February. Preference distributions occurred on 18 February. Results are final.

See also
 List of South Australian House of Assembly by-elections

References

External links
Candidate "how-to-vote" preference cards for the 2012 Ramsay by-election: ECSA
2012 Ramsay by-election guide: ABC elections
Two By-elections for South Australia?, Antony Green: ABC elections 1 August 2011
Port Adelaide and Ramsay By-elections, Antony Green: ABC elections 20 December 2011
Port Adelaide and Ramsay By-election Updates, Antony Green: ABC elections 19 January 2012

2012 elections in Australia
South Australian state by-elections
2010s in South Australia